Felaga is a reservoir located in the Atsbi Wenberta woreda of the Tigray Region in Ethiopia. The earthen dam that holds the reservoir was built in 1996 by Tigray Bureau of Agriculture.

Dam characteristics 
 Dam height: 11.9 metres
 Dam crest length: 115 metres
 Spillway width: 15 metres

Capacity 
 Original capacity: 900000 m³
 Dead storage: 115000 m³
 Reservoir area: 21.53 ha

Irrigation 
 Designed irrigated area: 75 ha
 Actual irrigated area in 2002: 40 ha

Environment 
The catchment of the reservoir is 8.16 km² large. The reservoir suffers from rapid siltation. The lithology of the catchment is Enticho Sandstone and precambrian rock. Part of the water that could be used for irrigation is lost through seepage; the positive side-effect is that this contributes to groundwater recharge.

References 

Reservoirs in Ethiopia
1996 establishments in Ethiopia
Tigray Region
Agriculture in Ethiopia
Water in Ethiopia